The Heinkel He 2, produced in Sweden as the Svenska S 3 and nicknamed the "Hansa", was a reconnaissance floatplane built in small numbers to equip the Swedish Navy in the 1920s. It was a refinement of the HE 1, sharing its same basic configuration as a low-wing, strut-braced monoplane with no tail fin and a rudder that barely protruded above and below the line of the fuselage.

Originally, three were purchased, with another one built by Svenska Aero some time later, and a fifth and final aircraft built by the Navy itself. The type remained in service for over 10 years, finally being retired in 1935.

Specifications

References

 

1920s German military reconnaissance aircraft
Floatplanes
HE 002
Svenska Aero aircraft
Low-wing aircraft
Single-engined tractor aircraft
Aircraft first flown in 1923